Jacques Crétineau-Joly (23 September 1803 – 1 January 1875) was a French Catholic journalist and historian.

Biography 
He was born at Fontenay-le-Comte, Vendée. At first he studied theology at the seminary of Saint-Sulpice, Paris, but, feeling that he had no vocation, he left after a stay of three years, during which he received the tonsure. He was now in his twentieth year; he quickly obtained the professorship of philosophy at the college in his native town, but soon resigned the position on account of ill-health, and went in 1823 to Rome, as companion and private secretary to the French ambassador, the Duke of Laval-Montmorency.

In 1826 in Rome he published Chants romains, which contained verses of an irreligious character. After his return home in 1828 he issued a number of volumes of poems and dramas, as Les Trappistes (Angoulême, 1828), Inspirations poétiques (Angoulême, 1833), and other poems. He accomplished much more as a polemical journalist in the struggle against the liberalism, which, after the revolution of July, directed the State during the reign of the Duke of Orléans as Louis-Philippe. Being a Vendean he was an enthusiastic adherent of the hereditary royal house, and zealously defended its rights in several Legitimist newspapers of which he was editor. In 1837 he went to reside in Paris in order to devote himself to historical research concerning the history of Vendée, but in 1839 he also took on the editing of L'Europe monarchique, a newspaper devoted to the interests of the Bourbons. Before this he had published two writings on Vendée: Épisodes des guerres de la Vendée (1834) and Histoire des généraux et chefs vendéens (1838). He now combined the two, making use of a large number of sources until then unknown, and issued his most important work: Histoire de la Vendée militaire (Paris, 1840–41), 4 vols; the fifth edition appeared in 1865. The work brought him repute on account of the animated descriptions, the clear arrangement of the great mass of material, and his painstaking care in the use of authorities. It is suggested, though, that he was less than scrupulous as to how he obtained his materials.

His reputation outside France was gained largely by his religious-political writings. The most important of these is his history of the Society of Jesus: Histoire religieuse, politique et littéraire de la Compagnie de Jesus, issued in Paris, 1844–46, in 6 vols.; German translation, 1845, 3d ed., 1851. The work was written under the auspices of the Society and was drawn from authentic and unpublished sources, and is very sympathetic to the Society. A companion volume was his much discussed work: Clément XIV et les Jésuites (Paris, 1847, 3d ed., 1848). To this, Augustin Theiner wrote a rejoinder on behalf of Pope Pius IX, and Ravignon one on behalf of the Society, whereupon Crétineau-Joly, after making careful research and in agreement with the pope, published L'Église romaine en face de la Révolution (1859, 2 vols.; 2d ed., 1863), a work that shows his unwavering fidelity to the Catholic Church. It contained the Alta Vendita Pamphlet.

He died in Vincennes near Paris.

Main works
 Histoire, religieuse, politique et littéraire de la Compagnie de Jésus, (6 vol.), Paris-Lyon, 1845.
 Clément XIV et les Jésuites, Paris-Bruxelles, 1847.
 Lettre au Père A. Theiner, Bruxelles-Paris, 1853.
 L'Église romaine en face de la Révolution, 2 vol., 1859 Google books

References

Attribution

1803 births
1875 deaths
People from Fontenay-le-Comte
Jesuit history in Europe
Historians of Jesuit history
19th-century French journalists
French male journalists
French male writers
19th-century French historians
19th-century male writers